Lahejia cinerascens is a species of leaf beetle of Saudi Arabia and Yemen described by Charles Joseph Gahan in 1896.

References

Eumolpinae
Beetles of Asia
Beetles described in 1896
Insects of the Arabian Peninsula
Taxa named by Charles Joseph Gahan